Adam John Hall  (born August 14, 1980) is an American former professional ice hockey player. A second round selection of the Nashville Predators in the 1999 NHL Entry Draft, Hall played in the National Hockey League for the Nashville Predators, New York Rangers, Minnesota Wild, Pittsburgh Penguins, Tampa Bay Lightning, Carolina Hurricanes and Philadelphia Flyers. He finished his career in the National League (NL), playing three seasons for HC Ambrì-Piotta.

Playing career
Hall was a member of the United States National Development Team Program, and twice represented the United States at the World Junior Ice Hockey Championships, in 1999 and 2000.  He was selected 52nd overall by the Nashville Predators in the second round of the 1999 NHL Entry Draft. He played four years with the Michigan State Spartans and was named to the Central Collegiate Hockey Association's Second All-Star Team in 2000.

He played his first NHL game for the Nashville Predators in 2001–02 after graduating from Michigan State.  He scored 16 goals and 12 assists in 2002–03, his rookie season. After four seasons with the Predators, he was dealt to the New York Rangers in exchange for Dominic Moore prior to the 2006–07 NHL season.  Hall played only half a season on Broadway, and was dealt to the Minnesota Wild for Pascal Dupuis in February 2007.

On October 1, 2007 he signed a one-year, two-way deal with the Pittsburgh Penguins and contributed during the Penguins run to the 2008 Stanley Cup Finals, where they lost in six games to the Detroit Red Wings.  He left the Penguins following the season, signing a three-year deal with the Tampa Bay Lightning worth $1.8-million.  Hall spent most of the 2009–10 season with the Lightning's AHL affiliate, the Norfolk Admirals.

In the following 2010–11 season, under new coach Guy Boucher, Hall played in all 82 games with the Lightning, recording seven goals and 18 points.  He led the Lightning in face-off percentage with 55 percent and ranked fourth overall with 360 face-offs won. Hall also led the team with 152 hits and was third among forwards with 59 blocked shots.  He was Tampa Bay's nominee for the Bill Masterton Memorial Trophy after battling his way back to the NHL.  He was one of only four Bolts to play in all 82 games. The 30-year-old veteran also played in all 18 Stanley Cup Playoff games with the Lightning as they made it to within one game of the Stanley Cup Final.  He recorded a goal and five points during the postseason. On the 29th of June, Hall was re-signed to a one-year, one-way contract.

During the 2012 NHL lockout Hall was signed to his second European team on a temporary contract with EV Ravensburg Tower Stars of the German 2nd Bundesliga. Hall led the team in his tenure with the Tower Stars with 15 points in 17 games before returning to the Lightning for the shortened 2012–13 season.  Twenty games into the season, Hall was placed on waivers and claimed by the Carolina Hurricanes on March 16, 2013.

On April 2, 2013, Hall was traded back to the Lightning along with a 7th-round draft pick for Marc-André Bergeron.  The Lightning promptly placed him on waivers and he was claimed by the Philadelphia Flyers on April 3. Hall signed a one-year, $600,000 contract with the Flyers on July 4, 2013.

On August 2, 2014, Hall signed a one-year contract with HC Ambri-Piotta of the Swiss National League A. He prematurely agreed to a two-year contract extension on December 24, 2014, making him a Bianco-Blu through the end of the 2016-17 season. He finished his first season in Switzerland with 14 goals and 18 assists in 50 games. He helped the team to stay in the NLA tallying 5 points in 11 games in the relegation round. In the summer of 2015, he was named alternate captain of the team. In three seasons with the team, he played a total of 159 games, tallying 40 goals and 46 assists.

On July 4, 2017, Hall announced his retirement from professional hockey.

Personal life

Hall grew up in Kalamazoo, MI but ultimately graduated from Pioneer High School (Ann Arbor, Michigan).  While at Michigan State University Hall was a finance major. Since retiring from professional hockey, he has entered into the wealth management sector with Morgan Stanley. He holds the Series 7 & 66 Licenses as well as the 215 Insurance License for Life, Health, and Variable Annuities.

His hobbies include fishing and golf. Adam and his wife, Dina, have two children: Evan & Mia.
He works for Morgan Stanley as a Financial Advisor,
and is a Global Sports and Entertainment Associate Director.

Career statistics

Regular season and playoffs

International

Awards and honors

References

External links

 

1980 births
Living people
HC Ambrì-Piotta players
American men's ice hockey right wingers
Carolina Hurricanes players
Ice hockey players from Michigan
KalPa players
Michigan State Spartans men's ice hockey players
Milwaukee Admirals players
Minnesota Wild players
Nashville Predators draft picks
Nashville Predators players
Norfolk Admirals players
New York Rangers players
Philadelphia Flyers players
Pittsburgh Penguins players
Sportspeople from Kalamazoo, Michigan
Tampa Bay Lightning players
USA Hockey National Team Development Program players